As Needed may refer to:

 As Needed (film), 2018 Italian film
 As Needed, a song by Beirut from the album No No No